Martin Max (born 7 August 1968) is a German former professional footballer who played as a striker.

One of the oldest winners of the Bundesliga's top scorer crown, at the age of 32 and 34, he represented four teams in his country of adoption.

Club career
Born in Tarnowskie Góry in Upper Silesia, Max started to play football in the youth of Rodło Górniki Bytom, and in 1982, he emigrated with his parents as ethnic Germans (Aussiedler) from Poland and went to Germany, where the family settled in Recklinghausen in the Ruhr region (Ruhrgebiet). In Recklinghausen, he joined the youth team of Blau-Weiß Post Recklinghausen, and in 1985, he transferred to the offspring of the 1. FC Recklinghausen.

At Schalke, Max revived his career, netting 23 goals in his first two seasons combined, adding three in the victorious UEFA Cup campaign, and his penalty shootout attempt in the final against Inter Milan.

He joined TSV 1860 Munich in 1999, and was crowned league topscorer in his first season, with 19. In 2001–02, he added 18 for a second individual accolade, tied with Márcio Amoroso.

Already at 35, Max moved to Hansa Rostock, and contributed massively to the former East Germany side's comfortable league position, as he netted 20 goals and ranked third in the goal charts. He retired at the end of the season with a total of 396 matches, with 126 first division goals.

After retiring, Max began running a soccer camp for youths.

International career
Courtesy of his stellar TSV performances, Max earned his only cap for Germany, on 17 April 2002, coming on as a substitute during the 84th minute in a 1–0 loss in a friendly in the Gottlieb-Daimler-Stadion (today Mercedes-Benz-Arena) in Stuttgart against Argentina. He was subsequently named on stand-by for that summer's 2002 FIFA World Cup.

Personal life
His son, Philipp, is also a footballer.

Career statistics

Honours
Borussia Mönchengladbach
DFB-Pokal: 1994–95

Schalke 04
UEFA Cup: 1996–97

Individual
Bundesliga top goalscorer: 1999–2000, 2001–02

References

External links
 
 
 

1968 births
Living people
People from Tarnowskie Góry
German people of Polish descent
Polish people of German descent
Polish emigrants to West Germany
Citizens of Germany through descent
German footballers
Association football forwards
Germany international footballers
Bundesliga players
Borussia Mönchengladbach players
FC Schalke 04 players
TSV 1860 Munich players
FC Hansa Rostock players
Kicker-Torjägerkanone Award winners
UEFA Cup winning players
West German footballers
Sportspeople from Silesian Voivodeship
People from Recklinghausen
Sportspeople from Münster (region)
Footballers from North Rhine-Westphalia